The 2012 Dubai Tennis Championships (also known as the 2012 Dubai Duty Free Tennis Championships for sponsorship reasons) was a 500 event on the 2012 ATP World Tour and a Premier event on the 2012 WTA Tour. Both of the events took place at the Aviation Club Tennis Centre in Dubai, United Arab Emirates. The women's tournament took place from February 20 to February 25, 2012, while the men's tournament took place from 27 February to 3 March 2012. Roger Federer and Agnieszka Radwańska won the singles titles.

ATP singles main draw entrants

Seeds

 1 Rankings as of February 20, 2012

Other entrants
The following players received wildcards into the singles main draw:
  Omar Awadhy
  Sergei Bubka
  Marko Djokovic
The following players received entry from the qualifying draw:
  Michael Berrer
  Marco Chiudinelli
  Andrey Golubev
  Lukáš Lacko

Retirements
  Richard Gasquet (illness)

ATP doubles main draw entrants

Seeds

1 Rankings are as of February 20, 2012

Other entrants
The following pairs received wildcards into the doubles main draw:
  Marsel İlhan /  Malek Jaziri
  Mohammed Ghareeb /  Abdullah Maqdas

WTA singles main draw entrants

Seeds

1 Rankings as of February 13, 2012

Other entrants
The following players received wildcards into the main draw:
 Fatma Al Nabhani
 Shahar Pe'er

The following players received entry from the qualifying draw:
 Iveta Benešová 
 Simona Halep
 Petra Martić 
 Aleksandra Wozniak

The following players received entry as lucky loser:
 Polona Hercog
 Casey Dellacqua

Withdrawals
  Victoria Azarenka (left ankle injury)
  Petra Kvitová (illness)
  Li Na (lower back injury)
  Vera Zvonareva

Retirements
  Dominika Cibulková (right hamstring strain)

ATP doubles main draw entrants

Seeds

1 Rankings are as of February 13, 2012

Other entrants
The following pairs received wildcards into the doubles main draw:
  Fatma Al Nabhani /  Andreja Klepač
  Casey Dellacqua /  Samantha Stosur
  Flavia Pennetta /  Francesca Schiavone

Retirements
  Maria Kirilenko (acute neck injury)

Finals

Men's singles

 Roger Federer defeated  Andy Murray, 7–5, 6–4
It was Federer's 2nd title of the year and 72nd of his career. It was his 5th win at Dubai, also winning in 2003, 2004, 2005, and 2007.

Women's singles

 Agnieszka Radwańska defeated  Julia Görges, 7–5, 6–4
It was Radwańska's 1st title of the year and 8th of her career. It was her 2nd Premier-level tournament of her career and 4th Premier overall.

Men's doubles

 Mahesh Bhupathi /  Rohan Bopanna defeated  Mariusz Fyrstenberg /  Marcin Matkowski, 6–4, 3–6, [10–5]

Women's doubles

 Liezel Huber /  Lisa Raymond defeated  Sania Mirza /  Elena Vesnina, 6–2, 6–1

References

External links
 Official website
 Television broadcasters

 
2012
Dubai Tennis Championships
Dubai Tennis Championships